Richard Scott Baumhammers (born May 17, 1965) is an American former immigration attorney and spree killer who began a racially motivated crime spree on April 28, 2000, in Pittsburgh, Pennsylvania, which left five individuals dead and one paralyzed.

Early life
Richard Baumhammers was born in Pittsburgh, Pennsylvania, to Andrejs and Inese Baumhammers, both Lutheran Latvian immigrants who fled the Soviet occupation of their homeland. Both parents would become faculty members of the University of Pittsburgh's School of Dental Medicine and would open a successful practice on Fifth Avenue, near the university. Baumhammers was the second child to Andrejs and Inese; his older sister Daina was born in 1963. The family settled in the Pittsburgh suburb of Mt. Lebanon. Baumhammers was a second-string kicker on the Mt. Lebanon High School football team.

After completing high school in 1983, Baumhammers graduated from Kent State University in Ohio in 1989 and began law school at Cumberland Law School in Birmingham, Alabama. A Cumberland classmate described Baumhammers as "gregarious, a good student, in the top third of his class." After graduating from Cumberland, Baumhammers enrolled in a specialized one-year international program at the University of the Pacific's McGeorge School of Law in Sacramento, California, where he received a master's degree in transnational business practice and specialized in both immigration law and international law.

For several years in the mid-1990s, Baumhammers lived in Atlanta, Georgia, where he was listed with the International Law Section members of the Georgia Bar Association. He was an active member as of March 2000.

Emotional instability
Richard Baumhammers returned to Pittsburgh in the late 1990s and lived with his parents following a series of emotional problems. Baumhammers had been treated for mental illness since 1993 and had voluntarily admitted himself to a psychiatric ward at least twice. Later, he would obsess about his physical appearance, believing that his face had been scarred by sunlight. However, dermatologists told Baumhammers that his skin was "perfectly normal." His father, Andrejs, would later say that he had seen signs of mental illness since Baumhammers was four years old.

Travel abroad
In 1993 Baumhammers traveled to Europe for a vacation, and upon returning home, his father was shocked by his son's emotional state. Andrejs would later testify that Baumhammers told him that during a visit to Ukraine, he became "euphoric"; but that by the time he traveled to Finland, he believed people were following and harassing him.

Andrejs would also claim later that Baumhammers told his parents that he could no longer speak openly to them because he believed the FBI was monitoring the house. Baumhammers insisted that his parents had to go into the basement to talk with him, using a pen and notepad. Andrejs Baumhammers claimed that Baumhammers even asked at one point to be taken to Dr. Kevorkian to help him commit suicide.

Richard Baumhammers admitted himself to Pittsburgh's Western Psychiatric Institute hospital and was diagnosed with delusional disorder of the persecutional type by Dr. Matcheri Keshavan. Over the next several years, Baumhammers would see eight psychiatrists, four clinical psychologists and try 16 different medications. After his release, Baumhammers stayed with his parents in their Mt. Lebanon home. He was a member of the Allegheny County Bar Association until he let his membership lapse in 1999.

In 1997, the now-unemployed Baumhammers traveled to Riga, Latvia, where he lived in an apartment on Kr. Barona Avenue which was less than a block from where his grandparents had lived in the mid-1930s. He acquired Latvian citizenship and sought to regain some of the family's properties lost during the Soviet occupation of Latvia. He made a claim under Latvia's de-nationalization process but was too late, as any claims had been required to be filed by 1996.

According to several people who associated with him in Latvia, Baumhammers mainly kept to himself. When he did socialize, he seemed to have felt most comfortable spending time with native Latvians and a few passing Latvian Americans. Those who met him in Latvia said they did not recall Baumhammers being prone to violence or ever espousing any racist remarks, and the Latvian government has no record of Baumhammers ever getting in trouble with authorities. Several Latvian acquaintances, however, described Baumhammers as intent on meeting women but "awkward."

In the fall of 1999, Baumhammers was arrested in Paris, France, for striking a 50-year-old female bartender named Vivianne Le Garrac because he "believed she was Jewish." Baumhammers then told both Le Garrac and the arresting officers that he was "mentally ill." The police took Baumhammers for evaluation to the psychiatric ward of the Hôtel-Dieu de Paris, then detained him at a police station. By week's end, he left on a flight for Spain.

On April 27, 2000, Baumhammers would purchase a Smith & Wesson .357 Magnum revolver in South Strabane Township, Pennsylvania.

Killing spree
On April 28, 2000, at 1:30 p.m. EDT, Richard Baumhammers walked to the home of his next-door neighbor, a 63-year-old Jewish woman named Anita "Nicki" Gordon, and fatally shot her, then set her house on fire. Gordon had been friends with Baumhammers' parents for 31 years. Afterwards, Baumhammers jumped into his black Jeep Cherokee and drove to the Beth El Congregation in Scott Township, where Gordon was a member of the synagogue. There, he fired into the synagogue's windows, then exited his vehicle and spray-painted two red swastikas on the building.

A short distance from the synagogue at the India Grocer in Scott Town Center, 31-year-old Anil Thakur, formerly of Bihar, India, was shot to death while picking up groceries during his lunch hour. A 25-year-old store manager named Sandeep Patel was shot in the neck and paralyzed. Patel would use a wheelchair for the next seven years before dying at the age of 32 in February 2007 from complications due to pneumonia at UPMC, in McCandless, Pennsylvania.

Baumhammers next drove to the Ahavath Achim Congregation in Carnegie, where he shattered the synagogue's glass windows with gunfire. At Robinson Town Centre, about ten miles from his home, he walked into Ya Fei Chinese Cuisine where Chinese restaurant manager Ji-ye Sun, aged 34 and Theo "Tony" Pham, a 27-year-old Vietnamese American cook were fatally shot in front of customers.

From Robinson Town Center, Baumhammers drove to the C.S. Kim School of Karate in Center Township, Beaver County where Garry Lee, a 22-year-old African American was exercising with a European American friend, George Thomas II. Baumhammers initially pointed the gun at Thomas, then turned and fired at Lee, killing him instantly.

Arrest and trial
Richard Baumhammers was pulled over in his Jeep and arrested at 3:30 p.m. EDT in the town of Ambridge, Pennsylvania. Baumhammers' spree lasted two hours and ran a 15-mile trail that spanned two counties and crossed three townships.

Baumhammers was charged with 19 crimes which included five counts of criminal homicides, one count of attempted homicide, eight counts of ethnic intimidation, two counts of arson, two counts of criminal mischief, one count of arson, one count of reckless endangerment of another person, one count of violation of uniform firearms act, two counts of institution vandalism and one count of aggravated assault.

When Pittsburgh police officers searched Baumhammers' Mt. Lebanon home, they found a document for the "Free Market Party," written by Baumhammers, which read like a manifesto and listed him as the "chairman." The document purportedly champions the rights of European Americans and complains that minorities and immigrants are outnumbering them. Baumhammers had also created an internet website on which he called for "an end to non-white immigration" and stated that "almost all" present-day immigration "is non-European."

On May 1, 2000, Richard Baumhammers was arraigned on charges of homicide, arson, and hate crimes. His bond was set at $1 million. On May 19, 2000, Allegheny County Common Pleas Judge Lawrence J. O'Toole ruled that Baumhammers was unfit to stand trial and ordered that Baumhammers undergo at least 90 days of psychiatric treatment. O'Toole made his decision after three psychiatrists examined Baumhammers, each coming to the conclusion that Baumhammers was psychologically unstable.  The psychiatrists agreed that he was psychotic but used different words to describe his condition: paranoid schizophrenic, psychotic thought disorder, and delusional disorder. These confused reporters.

Nearly a year later, on May 9, 2001, a jury found Richard Baumhammers guilty on all nineteen charges. Two days later, on May 11, 2001, after deliberating for 20 minutes, the same jury requested that Baumhammers be executed for his crimes. Baumhammers was scheduled to die by lethal injection. He is currently incarcerated at Greene State Correctional Institute in Franklin Township, Pennsylvania, awaiting judicial appeal dates.

On January 19, 2010, Pennsylvania Governor Ed Rendell signed an execution warrant for Baumhammers. He was scheduled to be put to death on March 18, 2010. On February 28, 2010, Allegheny County Judge Jeffrey A. Manning granted Baumhammers an indefinite stay of execution.

On November 26, 2019, Baumhammers lost an appeal of his conviction and death sentence.

See also
 List of attacks on Jewish institutions in the United States
 List of death row inmates in the United States

References

1965 births
2000 murders in the United States
20th-century attacks on synagogues and Jewish communal organizations in the United States
American people convicted of arson
American people convicted of murder
American people of Latvian descent
American prisoners sentenced to death
American spree killers
American white supremacists
Antisemitism in Pennsylvania
Cumberland School of Law alumni
Immigration lawyers
Kent State University alumni
Living people
People with delusional disorder
People convicted of murder by Pennsylvania
People from Mt. Lebanon, Pennsylvania
Prisoners sentenced to death by Pennsylvania
Racially motivated violence against African Americans
Racially motivated violence against Asian-Americans
Racially motivated violence in the United States
Race and crime in the United States
Spree shootings in the United States
White nationalism in Pennsylvania